Duncan Turnbull (born May 8, 1998) is an American professional footballer who currently plays as a goalkeeper.

College career

Notre Dame
Turnbull played 26 games for Notre Dame Fighting Irish during his Junior and Senior years, keeping 10 clean sheets. He helped Notre Dame reach the NCAA Championship quarter finals during the 2018 season. He majored in accounting.

Club career

MLS Draft
Turnbull was selected by the Houston Dynamo as the 70th pick in the 2020 MLS SuperDraft.

Portsmouth
Turnbull signed for Portsmouth on March 12, 2020 after a successful trial. He signed a contract until the summer of 2021 with the club holding an option for a further year. 
On January 12, 2021, he made his Portsmouth debut, starting in a 5–1 defeat at Peterborough United in the EFL Trophy.

Las Vegas Lights (loan)
On April 5, 2021, Turnbull joined USL Championship side Las Vegas Lights FC on loan until July 1, 2021.

Career statistics

References

1998 births
Living people
American soccer players
Notre Dame Fighting Irish men's soccer players
American expatriate sportspeople in England
Expatriate footballers in England
American expatriate soccer players
Houston Dynamo FC draft picks
Association football goalkeepers
Portsmouth F.C. players
Soccer players from Illinois
People from Geneva, Illinois
Las Vegas Lights FC players